Navan District is one of six districts of the province Oyón in Peru.

References